In mathematics, a generalized hypergeometric series is a power series in which the ratio of successive coefficients indexed by n is a rational function of n. The series, if convergent,  defines a generalized hypergeometric function, which may then  be defined over a wider domain of the argument by analytic continuation. The generalized hypergeometric series is sometimes just called the hypergeometric series, though this term also sometimes just refers to the Gaussian hypergeometric series. Generalized hypergeometric functions include  the (Gaussian) hypergeometric function and the confluent hypergeometric function as special cases, which in turn have many particular special functions as special cases, such as elementary functions, Bessel functions, and the classical orthogonal polynomials.

Notation
A hypergeometric series is formally defined as a power series 

in which the ratio of successive coefficients is a rational function of n. That is,

where A(n) and B(n) are polynomials in n.

For example, in the case of the series for the exponential function,

we have:

It is customary to factor out the leading term, so β0 is assumed to be 1. The polynomials can be factored into linear factors of the form (aj + n) and (bk + n) respectively, where the aj and bk are complex numbers.

For historical reasons, it is assumed that (1 + n) is a factor of B. If this is not already the case then both A and B can be multiplied by this factor; the factor cancels so the terms are unchanged and there is no loss of generality.

The ratio between consecutive coefficients now has the form 
,
where c and d are the leading coefficients of A and B. The series then has the form
,
or, by scaling z by the appropriate factor and rearranging,
.

This has the form of an exponential generating function. This series is usually denoted by

or

Using the rising factorial or Pochhammer symbol

this can be written

(Note that this use of the Pochhammer symbol is not standard; however it is the standard usage in this context.)

Terminology
When all the terms of the series are defined and it has a non-zero radius of convergence, then the series defines an analytic function. Such a function, and its analytic continuations, is called the hypergeometric function.

The case when the radius of convergence is 0 yields many interesting series in mathematics, for example the incomplete gamma function has the asymptotic expansion

which could be written za−1e−z 2F0(1−a,1;;−z−1). However, the use of the term hypergeometric series is usually restricted to the case where the series defines an actual analytic function.

The ordinary hypergeometric series should not be confused with the basic hypergeometric series, which, despite its name, is a rather more complicated and recondite series.  The "basic" series is the q-analog of the ordinary hypergeometric series. There are several such generalizations of the ordinary hypergeometric series, including the ones coming from zonal spherical functions on Riemannian symmetric spaces.

The series without the factor of n! in the denominator (summed over all integers n, including negative) is called the bilateral hypergeometric series.

Convergence conditions
There are certain values of the aj and bk for which the numerator or the denominator of the coefficients is 0.
 If any aj is a non-positive integer (0, −1, −2, etc.) then the series only has a finite number of terms and is, in fact, a polynomial of degree −aj.
 If any bk is a non-positive integer (excepting the previous case with bk < aj) then the denominators become 0 and the series is undefined.

Excluding these cases, the ratio test can be applied to determine the radius of convergence.
 If p < q + 1 then the ratio of coefficients tends to zero. This implies that the series converges for any finite value of z and thus defines an entire function of z. An example is the power series for the exponential function.
 If p = q + 1 then the ratio of coefficients tends to one. This implies that the series converges for |z| < 1 and diverges for |z| > 1. Whether it converges for |z| = 1 is more difficult to determine. Analytic continuation can be employed for larger values of z.
 If p > q + 1 then the ratio of coefficients grows without bound. This implies that, besides z = 0, the series diverges. This is then a divergent or asymptotic series, or it can be interpreted as a symbolic shorthand for a differential equation that the sum satisfies formally.

The question of convergence for p=q+1 when z is on the unit circle is more difficult. It can be shown that the series converges absolutely at z = 1 if 
.
Further, if p=q+1,  and z is real, then the following convergence result holds :
.

Basic properties
It is immediate from the definition that the order of the parameters aj, or the order of the parameters bk can be changed without changing the value of the function. Also, if any of the parameters aj is equal to any of the parameters bk, then the matching parameters can be "cancelled out", with certain exceptions when the parameters are non-positive integers. For example,
.
This cancelling is a special case of a reduction formula that may be applied whenever a parameter on the top row differs from one on the bottom row by a non-negative integer.

Euler's integral transform
The following basic identity is very useful as it relates the higher-order hypergeometric functions in terms of integrals over the lower order ones

Differentiation
The generalized hypergeometric function satisfies

and  

Additionally,

Combining these gives a differential equation satisfied by w = pFq:
.

Contiguous function and related identities
Take the following operator:
 
From the differentiation formulas given above, the linear space spanned by 
 
contains each of 
 

Since the space has dimension 2, any three of these p+q+2 functions are linearly dependent. These dependencies can be written out to generate a large number of identities involving .

For example, in the simplest non-trivial case,
,
,
,
So 
.

This, and other important examples,

,
,

,
,
,

can be used to generate continued fraction expressions known as Gauss's continued fraction.

Similarly, by applying the differentiation formulas twice, there are  such functions contained in 
 
which has dimension three so any four are linearly dependent. This generates more identities and the process can be continued. The identities thus generated can be combined with each other to produce new ones in a different way.

A function obtained by adding ±1 to exactly one of the parameters aj, bk in 
 
is called contiguous to 

Using the technique outlined above, an identity relating  and its two contiguous functions can be given, six identities relating  and any two of its four contiguous functions, and fifteen identities relating  and any two of its six contiguous functions have been found. (The first one was derived in the previous paragraph. The last fifteen were given by Gauss in his 1812 paper.)

Identities

A number of other hypergeometric function identities were discovered in the nineteenth and twentieth centuries. A 20th century contribution to the methodology of proving these identities is the Egorychev method.

Saalschütz's theorem
Saalschütz's theorem  is

For extension of this theorem, see a research paper by Rakha & Rathie.

Dixon's identity

For generalization of Dixon's identity, see a paper by Lavoie, et al.

Dougall's formula
Dougall's formula  gives the sum of a very well-poised series that is terminating and 2-balanced.

Terminating means that m is a non-negative integer and 2-balanced means that

Many of the other formulas for special values of hypergeometric functions can be derived from this as special or limiting cases.

Generalization of Kummer's transformations and identities for 2F2
Identity 1.

where 
;

Identity 2.

which links Bessel functions to 2F2; this reduces to Kummer's second formula for b = 2a:

Identity 3.
.

Identity 4.

which is a finite sum if b-d is a non-negative integer.

Kummer's relation
Kummer's relation is

Clausen's formula

Clausen's formula

was used by de Branges to prove the Bieberbach conjecture.

Special cases
Many of the special functions in mathematics are special cases of the confluent hypergeometric function or the hypergeometric function; see the corresponding articles for examples.

The series 0F0

As noted earlier, .

The series 0F1
The functions of the form  are called confluent hypergeometric limit functions and are closely related to Bessel functions. 

The relationship is: 
 
 
The differential equation for this function is 
 
or 
 
When a is not a positive integer, the substitution 
 
gives a linearly independent solution 
 
so the general solution is 
 
where k, l are constants. (If a is a positive integer, the independent solution is given by the appropriate Bessel function of the second kind.)

A special case is:

The series 1F0

An important case is: 
 
The differential equation for this function is 
 
or 
 
which has solutions 
 
where k is a constant.

 is the geometric series with ratio z and coefficient 1.

 is also useful.

The series 1F1

The functions of the form  are called confluent hypergeometric functions of the first kind, also written . The incomplete gamma function  is a special case.

The differential equation for this function is

or

When b is not a positive integer, the substitution

gives a linearly independent solution

so the general solution is

where k, l are constants.

When a is a non-positive integer, −n,  is a polynomial. Up to constant factors, these are the Laguerre polynomials. This implies Hermite polynomials can be expressed in terms of 1F1 as well.

The series 1F2

Relations to other functions are known for certain parameter combinations only.

The function  is the antiderivative of the cardinal sine.

It has been proposed that  can be expressed through the Bessel function  and its derivative.

The function  is essentially a Lommel function.

The series 2F0
This occurs in connection with the exponential integral function Ei(z).

The series 2F1

Historically, the most important are the functions of the form . These are sometimes called Gauss's hypergeometric functions, classical standard hypergeometric or often simply hypergeometric functions. The term Generalized hypergeometric function is used for the functions pFq if there is risk of confusion. This function was first studied in detail by Carl Friedrich Gauss, who explored the conditions for its convergence.

The differential equation for this function is

or

It is known as the hypergeometric differential equation. When c is not a positive integer, the substitution

gives a linearly independent solution

so the general solution for |z| < 1 is

where k, l are constants. Different solutions can be derived for other values of z. In fact there are 24 solutions, known as the Kummer solutions, derivable using various identities, valid in different regions of the complex plane.

When a is a non-positive integer, −n,
 

is a polynomial. Up to constant factors and scaling, these are the Jacobi polynomials. Several other classes of orthogonal polynomials, up to constant factors, are special cases of Jacobi polynomials, so these can be expressed using 2F1 as well. This includes Legendre polynomials and Chebyshev polynomials.

A wide range of integrals of elementary functions can be expressed using the hypergeometric function, e.g.:

The series 3F0
This occurs in connection with Mott polynomials.

The series 3F1
This occurs in the theory of Bessel functions. It provides a way to compute Bessel functions of large arguments.

The series 3F2

The function

is the dilogarithm

The function

is a Hahn polynomial.

The series 4F3

The function

is a Wilson polynomial.

Generalizations
The generalized hypergeometric function is linked to the Meijer G-function and the MacRobert E-function.  Hypergeometric series were generalised to several variables, for example by Paul Emile Appell and Joseph Kampé de Fériet; but a comparable general theory took long to emerge. Many identities were found, some quite remarkable. A generalization, the q-series analogues, called the basic hypergeometric series, were given by Eduard Heine in the late nineteenth century. Here, the ratios considered of successive terms, instead of a rational function of n, are a rational function of qn. Another generalization, the elliptic hypergeometric series, are those series where the ratio of terms is an elliptic function (a doubly periodic meromorphic function) of n.

During the twentieth century this was a fruitful area of combinatorial mathematics, with numerous connections to other fields. There are a number of new definitions of general hypergeometric functions, by Aomoto, Israel Gelfand and others; and applications for example to the combinatorics of arranging a number of hyperplanes in complex N-space (see arrangement of hyperplanes).

Special hypergeometric functions occur as zonal spherical functions on Riemannian symmetric spaces and semi-simple Lie groups. Their importance and role can be understood through the following example: the hypergeometric series 2F1 has the Legendre polynomials as a special case, and when considered in the form of spherical harmonics, these polynomials reflect, in a certain sense, the symmetry properties of the two-sphere or, equivalently, the rotations given by the Lie group SO(3).  In tensor product decompositions of concrete representations of this group Clebsch–Gordan coefficients are met, which can be written as 3F2 hypergeometric series.

Bilateral hypergeometric series are a generalization of hypergeometric functions where one sums over all integers, not just the positive ones.

Fox–Wright functions are a generalization of generalized hypergeometric functions where the Pochhammer symbols in the series expression are generalised to gamma functions of linear expressions in the index n.

See also
 Appell series
 Humbert series
 Kampé de Fériet function
 Lauricella hypergeometric series

Notes

References
 
 
 
 
 

  (the first edition has )
  (a reprint of this paper can be found in Carl Friedrich Gauss, Werke, p. 125)

  (part 1 treats hypergeometric functions on Lie groups)
 
 
 
 
 
 
  (there is a 2008 paperback with )

External links
 The book "A = B", this book is freely downloadable from the internet.
 MathWorld
 
 
 
 

Factorial and binomial topics

Ordinary differential equations
Mathematical series